Michael Bone (born 3 October 1942) is a former Australian rules footballer who played with Collingwood in the Victorian Football League (VFL) during the 1960s.

Bone, who kicked four goals in his second VFL game, was recruited from Thornbury YMCW. Mainly used as a rover, he played all 21 games in 1964 and appeared in the 1964 VFL Grand Final loss to Melbourne.

He also had a long career in the Ovens & Murray Football League, playing 144 games for Wodonga. Bone captained - coached Wodonga to three consecutive Ovens and Murray Football League grand finals, winning premierships in both 1967 and 1969. (defeated by Corowa Football Club in 1968).

References

1942 births
Australian rules footballers from Victoria (Australia)
Collingwood Football Club players
Wodonga Football Club players
Wodonga Football Club coaches
Living people